The 10th National Congress of the Chinese Communist Party was a significant Communist Party Congress in China following the fall of Lin Biao and the continuation of the Cultural Revolution.  It profoundly elected the 10th Central Committee of the Chinese Communist Party. 

It was held in Beijing, China, between August 24–28, 1973. The congress was attended by 1249 people which represented 28 million party members across China. It was preceded by the 9th National Congress. It was ultimately succeeded by the 11th National Congress of the Chinese Communist Party.

Details of the Congress 
On 20 August 1973, prior to the start of the congress, the Politburo of the Chinese Communist Party adopted a resolution to suspend the party memberships of Lin Biao, Ye Qun, Huang Yongsheng, Wu Faxian, Li Zuopeng and Qiu Huizuo indefinitely.

The congress was opened on 24 August, with Mao Zedong presiding over the meeting, Zhou Enlai delivering the political report and Wang Hongwen reporting regarding the revision of the Constitution. Mao and Zhou suggested the political rehabilitation of 13 old guard members such as Tan Zhenlin and Li Jingquan.

The 10th Congress affirmed the revised Constitution of the Chinese Communist Party that was also adopted by the 9th national congress. It stipulated some adjustments in the structure but the provisions of the section is not much changed, such as the guiding ideology and the basic principles of the party. In the edited bill, only discussions and doctrines proposed or related to Lin Biao were removed.

The 10th congress elected 195 Central Committee members and 124 alternate members, with the Gang of Four taking key roles within the central committee and the rehabilitation of politicians persecuted during the Cultural Revolution, which included Li Zuopeng, Deng Xiaoping, Wang Jiaxiang and others.

Significance of the Congress

New power structure 
The fall of Lin Biao and his cohorts in 1971 left many vacant posts in the party and the government. Of the 21-man Politburo only 10 were left and of its five-man Standing Committee, only three – Mao Zedong, Zhou Enlai and Kang Sheng – were still present. Therefore, the 10th congress convened to elect new members to the unoccupied positions and to condemn the actions of Lin Biao as a right opportunist who "waved the red flag to defeat the red flag".

During the congress, the Gang of Four managed to secure positions with the support from Mao. Jiang Qing and Yao Wenyuan were elected to the Poliburo, Zhang Chunqiao to the Standing Committee and Wang Hongwen as the party's second vice-chairman.

Continuation of the Cultural Revolution 
Wang Hongwen in his debut keynote address during the congress announced the smashing of the "two bourgeois headquarters, the one headed by Liu Shaoqi and the other by Lin Biao". Wang stressed the revolutionary spirit of daring to go against the tide and the importance of training young leaders. With the future of the country in the hands of the young, struggle and continued revolution would punctuate Chinese political life.

References 

National Congress of the Chinese Communist Party
1973 in China
1973 conferences